Johann Sebastian Bach composed the church cantata  ("Break with hungry men thy bread" or "Give the hungry ones thy bread"), in Leipzig and first performed on 23 June 1726, the first Sunday after Trinity that year. On the first Sunday after Trinity in 1724, he began his second cycle, consisting of chorale cantatas. The cantata  is regarded as part of Bach's third cantata cycle which was written sporadically between 1725 and 1727.

The text of the cantata is taken from a 1704 collection of librettos from Meiningen, many of which had been set to music in the cantatas of Bach's distant cousin Johann Ludwig Bach, Kapellmeister at Meiningen. The librettos have been attributed to his employer Duke Ernst Ludwig von Sachsen-Meiningen. The symmetrical structure of seven movements is typical for this collection: the opening quotation from the Old Testament, followed by a recitative and an aria; then the central quotation from the New Testament, followed by an aria and a recitative, leading into the final chorale. The theme of BWV 39 is an invocation to be grateful for God's gifts and to share them with the needy.

Bach set the opening Old Testament passage as a large scale complex movement for four-part chorus and full orchestra in three sections, one for each sentence in the biblical quotation. By contrast he set the New Testament passage beginning the second part as a bass solo accompanied by a single obbligato violoncello, the bass voice representing the traditional voice of Jesus. The cantata is scored for three groups of instruments—alto recorders, oboes and strings—from which the four obbligato soloists are drawn that accompany the two arias, for alto and soprano.

Composition history 
Bach composed the cantata for the First Sunday after Trinity on 23 June 1726. The precise dating of the autograph manuscript was only determined fairly recently by authorities on Bach, particularly those like Alfred Dürr, Christoph Wolff and Klaus Hofmann who were involved in preparing Urtext editions for the Neue Bach-Ausgabe and establishing the Bach Archive in Leipzig. The circumstances surrounding the composition were clarified by other Bach scholars, notably William H. Scheide and Konrad Küster. Before the dating was known, several commentators had given 1732 as the date of composition, dubbing it the "Refugee Cantata", supposedly composed in response to the arrival in Germany of Protestants banished from Salzburg; it is unknown whether there was a repeat performance of the cantata to commemorate that event.

The first Sunday after Trinity marks the beginning of the second half of the liturgical year, "in which core issues of faith and doctrine are explored". The most skilled church musicians—including SATB soloists and others doubling as choristers and instrumentalists—were based at the Thomaskirche where cantatas were performed each Sunday and on feast days. The other instrumentalists were either professional string players (Kunstgeiger), members of the Leipzig Stadtpfeifer, an ancient band of brass and wind players, or travelling musicians. Remaining gaps in the orchestra were filled by pupils from the Thomasschule and university students. Bach's orchestra would have had 12-20 players in addition to himself and an organist. The soloists, choir and orchestra performed from two galleries above and around the principal organ loft in the centre of the Thomaskirche. Sometimes two cantatas would be performed during a service; and when a cantata was written in two parts, a sermon would be preached between the two parts or the second part would accompany communion. As Thomascantor, Bach instituted several changes in performance practise in Leipzig: he introduced more frequent and regular rehearsals for choristers, including individual lessons; he installed former students as organists and directors of music in the churches for which he was responsible; and—going beyond his church duties—he helped select and train municipal musicians.

On his appointment Bach embarked on the project of composing yearly cycles of cantatas with one for each Sunday and holiday of the liturgical year, a project which  describes as "an artistic undertaking on the largest scale". The first cantata he wrote was Die Elenden sollen essen, BWV 75, beginning the first cycle on the first Sunday after Trinity in 1723; the cantata O Ewigkeit, du Donnerwort, BWV 20 from 1724 began the second cycle, again on the first Sunday after Trinity. With BWV 20, Bach entered on a new scheme for the second cycle: to compose chorale cantatas based exclusively on the main Lutheran hymns associated with the day in the liturgical calendar. After completing his second cycle, Bach's third cycle was composed sporadically between 1725 and 1727. Moreover, Bach does not seem to have marked the anniversary of his appointment in 1725. Somewhat exceptionally, from February to late September 1726, the cantatas performed in Leipzig were mainly those by Bach's distant cousin Johann Ludwig Bach, court composer at Meiningen, with gaps filled by Bach's own cantatas written in the previous year. During this period Bach not only had access to his cousin's compositions, but also to religious texts from the court at Meiningen. Of the relatively small number of nine cantatas newly composed by Bach during this period, seven were settings of Meiningen texts and all but one of these followed the formal compositional scheme of his cousin (BWV 39, BWV 88, BWV 187, BWV 45, BWV 102 and BWV 17). The first cantata based on a Meiningen text was Gott fähret auf mit Jauchzen, BWV 43 for the Feast of the Ascension on 30 May 1726.  Following that, on 23 June 1726, the first Sunday after Trinity, Bach revived tradition by composing the cantata  for the beginning of his fourth year in office: it was the first "Meiningen" cantata written for an ordinary Sunday.

The prescribed readings for the Sunday were from the First Epistle of John, (the "God is Love" verses), and from the Gospel of Luke (the parable of the Rich man and Lazarus). Bach's first cantata for the occasion, BWV 75 (1723), had concentrated on the contrast between the rich and the poor; and the second, the chorale cantata , BWV 20 (1724), concerned repentance when faced with death and eternity. In contrast the libretto of  took as its theme gratitude for God's gifts and the duty to share them with the needy.

The libretto used by Bach for BWV 39 comes the 1704 collection for Meiningen, entitled ; these religious texts have been attributed to Ernst Ludwig I, Duke of Saxe-Meiningen, Johann Ludwig Bach's employer. All the Meiningen cantatas of Johann Ludwig Bach, performed in Leipzig between February and September 1726, had librettos from this collection. They all have a uniform structure in seven verse sections: each cantata starts with a passage from the Old Testament; followed by a recitative on a long verse text; an aria; a central passage from the New Testament; a second aria; a second recitative, often with more than two sentences so that it can end with a chorus; and a final chorale, sometimes with two stanzas. The Old Testament and New Testament passages usually have a common theme, with the former often prefiguring the coming of Christ. Bach departed from his cousin's model in two ways. Firstly he divided the libretto into two parts that framed the church sermon: Bach usually started Part II with the central New Testament passage; only in the case of BWV 102 did he place it at the conclusion of Part I. Secondly Bach took the sixth verse section of each libretto, written in archaic alexandrines, wholly as a recitative leading into the final chorale.

In the libretto of BWV 39, the Old Testament passage is taken from the Book of Isaiah and the New Testament passage from the Epistle to the Hebrews. Both passages have as common themes the invocations to love thy neighbour and to share God's gifts. The final section of the libretto is the sixth verse of David Denicke's 1648 hymn "", which involves the same themes.  This hymn was sung to the same melody as the hymn "". The melody was first published by Louis Bourgeois as Psalm 42 in his collection of Psaumes octante trios de David (Geneva, 1551). The psalm melody itself was probably derived from the secular song "" in the Manuscrit de Bayeux published around 1510.

Music

Instrumentation and structure 

Bach scored the cantata for three vocal soloists (soprano (S), alto (A) and bass (B)), a four-part choir SATB, and a Baroque instrumental ensemble of two alto recorders (Fl), two oboes (Ob), first and second violins (Vl), violas (Va) and basso continuo (Bc). There are two sets of continuo parts from 1726: one is a score transposed for positive organ with figuration added by Bach in the first three movements; the other has annotations by the copyist for violoncello and double bass.

The Meiningen cantatas of Johann Ludwig Bach were scored for the four vocal parts and a small group of instrumentalists, consisting of two oboes, violins, violas and continuo: at Meiningen, as with many of the smaller courts in Germany, resources were limited; it appears that continuo instruments like bassoons were available only when these works were performed elsewhere. When Bach performed his cousin's cantatas in Leipzig in 1726, he used the same orchestral forces as Meiningen for all but two, adding trumpets with drums in one and piccolo trumpets in another.

The baroque alto recorder (blockflöte in German) enjoyed a period of popularity in Europe as an orchestral instrument in the seventeenth century, starting with Monteverdi in his opera L'Orfeo. By the middle of the eighteenth century it had been displaced by the transverse flute. In France the transition was more marked, since cultural life centred on Paris; it was more gradual in Germany, made up of many separate principalities, all with their own court or municipal musicians. The baroque recorder was used in orchestral music in association with death and the supernatural; to express tenderness; in pastoral scenes (as the shepherd's pipe); and to imitate bird song.

In his places of employment prior to his appointment in Leipzig in 1723, Bach used the recorder as an orchestral instrument many times in cantatas and concertos; at Leipzig his use of the recorder diminished and BWV 39 was the last cantata he composed that included the instrument.  listed specific themes in movements of cantatas for which Bach had chosen the recorder: sleep, death, weeping, nature, sheep grazing, the singing of angels, and celestial light.  wrote of "Bach's sensitivity to particular instruments ... to realize the spiritual intent which was inherent in their characteristic qualities"; even when Bach had only limited instruments at his disposal, he chose with care. Echoing , Riemenschneider wrote that Bach "used the recorder for certain effects, where the text was especially intimate in the effacement of self and in the giving over to a higher power. He also used it for expressing extremely tender moments, where thoughts of death and the life to come were in question." The themes of the movements scored for recorders in Brich dem Hungrigen dein Brot conform to Riemenschneider's description.

The cantata BWV 39 is in two parts, conforming to the structure of the Meiningen series. The first part begins with a long choral movement for four-part chorus and full orchestra. It is followed by a recitative for bass and an aria for alto, with obbligato violin and oboe. The second part begins with the central movement based on the New Testament text, a solo for bass, as vox Christi, accompanied by an obbligato violoncello. It is followed by an aria for soprano with obbligato recorders in unison. The second recitative for alto and strings leads into the concluding four-part chorale in which the choir doubled by the full orchestra. The complex scoring of the monumental opening movement, employing full orchestra and chorus, contrasts with that of the succeeding non-choral movements, which are accompanied by smaller more intimate groups of instruments.

In the following table of the movements, the scoring follows the Neue Bach-Ausgabe. The keys and time signatures are taken from Alfred Dürr, using the symbol for common time (4/4). The instruments are shown separately for woodwind and strings, while the continuo, playing throughout, is not shown.

Movements
The cantata is written in seven movements, with a symmetrical form: the first and last movements are for chorus and orchestra; the second and sixth movements are recitatives; the third and fifth movements are arias in two parts with da capo repeats only for the instrumental ritornello; and the central fourth movement is an accompanied solo. The metrical English translations below of the texts of the first six movements are by Henry Sandwith Drinker; and that of the seventh movement (chorale) is from the 1722 Psalmodica Germanica of John Christian Jacobi and Isaac Watts.

First movement

The monumental first movement, a long and complex chorus initially superposed on an elaborate orchestral ritornello, exemplifies how Bach—"with perfect mastery"—combined the considerable range of compositional skills at his disposal in BWV 39. The broad structure of the movement is derived from that of the motet, with each separate portion of the Old Testament text (Isaiah 58:7–8) receiving a different musical treatment matching the text. In the 218 bars, there are three distinct sections corresponding to the three pronouncements of Isaiah. The first and last section are highly developed, with fugal episodes; whereas the intermediate section is a short bridge between the two. Although simpler in form than the first and third sections, it combines musical features from both. The complex form of the first movement reflects the Old Testament text, which  describes as long and  "multifaceted". The structure of the movement can be summarised as follows:

First section

The movement opens with an extensive orchestral sinfonia marked Concerto in the autograph score. Lasting 22 bars, this ritornello establishes the prevailing anguished mood of the first section. It is heard twice again, but only as the accompanying backdrop for the separate musical material of the chorus, a setting of the first phrase of the Old Testament text. The open motifs are also heard again in the fragmentary accompaniment of the central choral fugato episode between the two reprises of the ritornello. The different motifs in the ritornello thus also serve the purpose of accompanying specific parts of the text. The first predominant motif consist of detached repeated quaver chords, passed antiphonally between the three instrumental groups of recorders, oboes and strings. These are accompanied by similarly detached crotchets, scored as quavers with rests, in the walking bass of the continuo. After thirteen bars there follows a four bar passage of melifluous semiquaver passages in thirds for the recorders with imitative responses from the oboes; the upper strings take up the detached crotchets and the continuo the groups of detached repeated quavers. In the four succeeding bars the quaver figure in the continuo line is replaced by a new motif of rising semiquaver scales, with the detached quavers and crotchets passing into the upper strings and the woodwind playing sustained chords. In the concluding two bars of the sinfonia the semiquaver scale motif passes into the recorders in thirds and is taken up by the other instruments for the sustained final cadence.

Several commentators, most notably  and more recently , have interpreted the repeated quaver figures passed between different groups of instruments as "unmistakably depict[ing] the gesture of breaking bread." Spitta also felt that the detached notes, which subsequently accompany quite different text, added "a tender, dreamy tinge" to the movement. For  and subsequent commentators like , however, the motif represented the "uncertain, tottering steps ... of the wretched ones who are being supported and led into the house."

After the closing cadence of the sinfonia, there is a reprise of the ritornello in the orchestra in a slightly expanded form. Immediately the chorus enters in pairs with their own musical material, singing in homphonic form. The word "brich" (break) in their initial declamatory phrase "Brich dem hungrigen dein Brot" is echoed in the pauses in the musical setting, pauses already present in the fragmentary detached quavers of the accompaniment. Equally well the repetition of this phrase is broken for one bar during which the original texture of the sinfonia is briefly heard again.  describes the musical material as representing "imploring gestures, emotionally choked, their pleas breaking and stuttering." In contrast the following phrase "und die, so in Elend sind" has sustained melismas in all the parts on the word "Elend" (misery), with chromaticism, suspensions and descending quaver figures.

There is a further contrast in the next phrase "führe ins Haus" where the soprano and alto are paired with a long lyrical melisma in semiquavers on the word "führe" (lead). This new musical material is matched by the semiquaver figures of the woodwind. Similarly the detached quaver accompaniment in the continuo is matched by parallel figures in the tenor and bass parts. In the next four bars of this second rendition of the sinfonia,  there is a reprise of the rising semiquaver figures in the continuo and sustained chords in the woodwind. In the first two bars each voice in the chorus enters successively with a new rising fourth motif for the phrase "und die" before the music intensifies as the chorus joins the sustained chords of the woodwind for the word "Elend". The final two bars of the closing cadence of the ritornello are more complex. On the one hand the mounting tension in the previous bars is resolved with the phrase "führe ins Haus" in the soprano, alto and bass voices.

On the other hand, in the first of these two bars the tenor part embarks on the fugal subject of the following fugato section. The beginning of the subject is thus partially hidden or overlaid by the two bar cadence, from which it emerges. The condensed subject of the fugue incorporates the rising fourth motif for "und die" as well as the motif of rising semiquaver scales from the ritornello and the descending semiquaver scale from the soprano-alto melisma on "führe".

In the fugato section each voice in the chorus sings the fugal subject following the tenors: the altos come in next, emerging from the tenor part; then the sopranos, emerging from the alto part; and finally the fourth statement of the subject in the basses leads into a true repetition of the closing two bar cadence of the ritornello, with a reprise of the original accompaniment in the orchestra, thus concluding the fugato episode. As  comments, the first tenor entry with its prominent A flats and D flats "has a pathos all of its own, especially when for eight bars it is joined in imitation by the altos." The musicologist André Pirro notes that the A flat–D flat motif in the fugal subject on the word Elend is typical of Bach's use of suspended figures to evoke the burden of suffering and misery.

After the fugato episode, the ritornello resumes for a third time, with the chorus singing a variant of their homophonic material with much of the counterpoint inverted; this time, however, there is no fugal episode inserted before the final two bar cadence.

Intermediate section

The short second section in common time is a 12 bar bridging interlude linking the first and third sections. The key modulates from D minor to C minor, so that the surrounding first and third sections can modulate from their starting key to its dominant and thus the whole movement can return to its original key at the close.

The bridging section is composed in the seventeenth century concertato style, adopted in many of Bach's earlier Weimar cantatas, with the chorus playing the role of the concertino soloists and the orchestra the ripieno.  The movement starts off with the basses singing "so du einen nacket siehest" (when thou naked seest), without any accompaniment even from the continuo.

The full choir and orchestra respond with "so kleide ihn" (then clothe him), with alto recorders echoing the initial bass theme. In the next concertino passage the bass theme is sung by the altos, while the sopranos sing a florid counter-theme with semiquaver scales—a long melisma on "kleide".

The bass theme is finally sung by the tenors, with the florid accompaniment in the altos and sopranos. In the second set of six bars, the choir sing the text "und entzeuch dich nicht von deinem Fleisch" (and hide not thyself from thine own flesh) in chords, taking up the repeated detached notes of the initial bass theme. The bass line incorporates the semiquaver scales.

The beginning of the bass part provides a motif for the continuo accompaniment, which is imitated in counterpoint by the two alto recorders until the end of the section, producing a running line of semiquavers. The accompanying oboes and upper strings respond to each other with fragmented quaver motifs derived from the vocal material of this section as well as the quaver motifs in the first section.

 has pointed out that the musical device of silencing parts of an ensemble is frequently used by Bach as a form of musical iconography. In this case the unaccompanied basses are "the musical equivalent of nakedness", while in contrast the full orchestra and chorus "unfolds itself in broad drapings to urge the merciful charity signified by the words 'clothe him'." This section is more lively than the first with a greater feeling of urgency.

Final section

In the last section in spirited 3/8 time, the predominant mood is of joyous exaltation reflecting the text from Isaiah. The structure of the choral material in this final section complements that of the first section; there a fugal passage was enclosed between two homophonic episodes; here a homophonic episode is preceded and followed by fugal passages. While the first section is preceded by the lengthy orchestral sinfonia, the final section ends with a short coda for full chorus and orchestra.

The fugue subject starts to the words "Alsdann wird dein Licht herfürbrechen wie die Morgenröte" in the tenor voice with an upbeat, continuing for seven bars as it begins a long melisma on the first syllable of "röte" (dawneth). In the seventh bar the alto voice enters with the same subject, at which point the tenors takes up the material of the counter-subject for the next seven bars to conclude the melisma. Beneath both parts the continuo plays its own independent material, built up from two motifs: the first motif is a sospirans figure made up of four semiquavers followed by a scale of four ascending quavers, heard in the first two bars; and the second, which starts in the fifth bar, is an angular three-note quaver motif that descends in a sequence. 

The altos and tenors are joined after seven bars by the fugue subject in the soprano voice. After a further seven bars the basses sing the last statement of the subject, accompanied by the full orchestra playing colla parte except for the two alto recorders, bringing the first fugato section to a close. The alto recorders play fragmented quaver figures in unison some of which are derived from the angular three-note continuo motif, leading into the first seven bar homophonic choral passage.

With a colla parte accompaniment in the oboes and continuo, the chorus sing the text "und deine Besserung wird schnell Wachsen" in clipped motet-style with chords and dotted rhythms, until a florid melisma in semiquavers on "Wachsen" (prosper). They are accompanied in the upper strings by detached quavers on the second and third beats of each bar; while the two alto recorders play in unison their own florid line of running semiquavers derived from the semiquaver figures in the fugue counter-subject.

This homophonic choral passage is followed by the first of three short four-bar orchestral ritornellos, with a texture that has already been heard very briefly in the bar when the chorus pause between the fugato and homophonic passages. As in the opening sinfonia, the instruments play in four distinct groups—alto recorders, oboes, upper strings and continuo—but the sparseness there is now replaced by a jubilant canzona-style flourish.

The semiquaver motifs in the alto recorders were already heard in the second and third bars of the obbligato accompaniment to the homophonic episode, but here they play in thirds. The other orchestral groups play pairs of detached quaver chords, with upper strings on the beat and oboes off the beat. The choir then rejoin the orchestra for the second of the three homophonic passages to the text "und dein Gerichtigkeit wird vor dir hergehen". At fourteen bars in length, it is the longest and most complex of the three. The broad structure of the episode is a canon between the soprano and bass parts.

The canonic entries are separated by a bar until the stretto starting in the ninth bar when they are separated by a quaver. The vocal line is ingeniously composed from figures that have already been heard in the section: the start of the fugue subject; the initial sospirans continuo motif with its second part inverted and in dotted rhythm, like the opening "hungrigen" of the first section; the semiquaver scales in the fugue subject and their inversions; and the portion of the fugue counter-subject with suspensions. There are two melismas on "hergehen" (go onward), with the second one—during the stretto—rising to a climax before a concluding two bar cadence similar to the one in the first homophonic passage.  The alto and tenor voices at first accompany the canon with imitative figures; but during the stretto the alto pairs with the soprano in thirds and the tenor pairs with the bass. The rest of the orchestra play colla parte with the singers except for the alto recorders. As in the first homophonic section they play an obbligato accompaniment in unison. Before the stretto it is formed of running semiquavers, made up of the ritornello motif and the scales of the vocal parts. During the stretto they play anapaests—motifs of joy—off the beat, increasing the level of excitement and adulation.
in all the voices 
After the cadence, the movement is punctuated by a second rendition of the four-bar orchestral ritornello. This time the oboes play the semiquaver motif, the alto recorders play the pair of detached quavers on the beat and the upper strings those off the beat. This leads into the second fugato episode in the key of C minor.

The fugue subject, initially sung by the basses to the words "und die Herrlichkeit des Herrn wird dich zu sich nehmen", is a slight variant of the original one. This can be seen by comparing the tenor line in the first fugato episode with the alto entry in the second.

Like the first and second homophonic passages, however, the first and second fugato episodes differ in unexpected ways, resulting in a more elevated mood and richer orchestral texture. The fugato episode is lengthened by having a new fifth fugal voice provided by the alto recorders in unison, scored in flowing semiquavers. The chorus and alto recorders enter in the following order: basses, tenors, altos, alto recorders and finally sopranos. All the voices have long melismas on the word "nehmen" (reward).  The continuo reprise the accompaniment of the first fugato episode during the first statement of the fugue subject and counter-subject in the basses. This time, however, there is an additional accompaniment from the two alto recorders consisting mainly of the quaver motifs from the ritornello. The alto recorders then briefly fall silent, while the basses unite with the continuo part, singing its independent musical material until the end of the episode. After the first entry of the basses, the other instrumental groups enter to play colla parte with each new voice: the violas enter with the tenors; the second oboe and second violins enter with the altos; the two alto flutes enter in unison; and finally the sopranos enter with the first oboe and first violins. The anticipated entry of the sopranos after the altos is further delayed by the extension of the fugue subject in the alto recorders by four bars, with repetitions of the figures in bars 1–2 and 5-6; all the material is played at unexpected pitches. Below the fugue subject in the two recorders, the altos and tenors sing imitative syncopated responses based on the counter-subject, leading up to the true entry of the sopranos. With the recorders taking up the counter-subject, the sopranos sing the fugue subject at its expected pitch, with the imitative polyphony continuing in the middle voices, bringing the fugato episode to its concluding cadence.

The orchestral ritornello punctuates the movement for a third and last time, the upper strings playing the semiquaver figures, with the detached quavers on the beat in the oboes and off the beat in the alto recorders. It leads directly into the homophonic coda in the last seven bars of the movement. With the same orchestral pairings as the fugato episode, the sopranos joyously sing out the beginning of the second fugue theme below trilling recorders before joining the polyphony of the other voices—with a last emphatic sospirans figure in the basses—for the final exultant rendition of the text.

As  states, this "short tutti outburst ... closes this superb chorus in a blaze of 'Herrlichkeit'." , commenting on the change of mood in the final section, writes, "The sense of relief after the stifling pathos of the opening sections is palpable ... After so much pathos, the final coda led by the sopranos releases the pent-up energy in an explosion of joy."  comments, "The words, to the end of this section, are based on Isaiah 58:7-8 ... It brings Jesus' words to mind, 'Inasmuch as you do it unto them, you do it unto me' and his denunciation of the careless rich. Isaiah continues, 'Then shall thy light break forth as the morning and thy healing shall spring forth speedily; and thy righteousness shall go before thee.' Bach sets the paraphrase of these last words to a glorious fugue, with two expositions, and so brings to an end one of his finest choruses and one that is worthy indeed of the inspired words of Isaiah."  also expresses his admiration for Bach's setting: "The chorus of the first movement, set to two beautiful verses of Isaiah, brings out the meaning of that text in the Sermon on the Mount, 'Blessed  are the merciful, for they shall obtain mercy', and the cantata is fitly concluded with the sixth verse of the paraphrase of the beatitudes. It is an affecting picture of Christian love, softening with tender hand and pitying sympathy the sorrow of the brethren, and obtaining the highest reward."  describes the perfect balance in the proportions of the different sections, "marking a magnificent journey from darkness into light": the first fugato episode represents "the light emanating from the merciful walking in the paths of righteousness"; the second "the light of the glory of God".

Second and third movements
The four movements (2,3,5 and 6) placed symmetrically around the central New Testament passage in the fourth movement, are all settings of Madrigal-style verse. The second movement is a setting of a lengthy text beginning "" (The Lord provides: He pours his riches down on us; without this nothing here on earth would flourish). Bach set it as an unadorned secco recitative, without arioso episodes, accompanied by bare sustained notes in the continuo. The bass soloist proclaims that God's abundant gifts should be shared with the poor and lowly; and that consideration for the needy, not wealth used for tributes, will find favour with God.

This leads into an alto aria accompanied by obbligato violin and oboe:

The theme of the text is that, although man may follow God's example during his lifetime, it is only in heaven that he will reap the benefits of the seeds he has sown. The aria starts with a ritornello in trio sonata form for the concertante solo violin and oboe over a steady continuo bass line.  The ritornello is made up of a continuous stream of distinctive semiquaver motifs played against sustained notes, which alternate between the two solo instruments as they respond to each other imitatively and in canon. The semiquaver motifs occasionally and briefly pass to the continuo part. The alto enters with its own separate themes (see above) singing the first half of the text; the obbligato instruments weave a contrapuntal accompaniment around the vocal line with motifs from the ritornello. The words are sung a second time in a different setting, with melismas derived from semiquaver motifs in the ritornello together with new quaver motifs:

An episode for the concertante instruments based on the ritornello is then followed by the alto singing the second half of the text; a further instrumental interlude is followed by a second alto rendition of the same words, after which the aria concludes with a da capo repetition of the opening ritornello. Each of these two alto sections begins with the same musical figures as its first entry. The material there is developed with motifs from the ritornello reflecting the intensifying mood: the word  ("sow") is set to long and enraptured semiquaver melismas; 

and the "ein" in the contrasting phrase  ("reap")—a reference to eternity—is sustained on a single note for four bars.

Fourth movement

The text of the fourth movement is adapted from St Paul's Epistle to the Hebrews:

The style is typical of Bach's treatment of such declamatory texts, a compositional style between arioso and aria. The bass solo is accompanied by an obbligato violoncello, with an ever-varying melodious dialogue in canon and counterpoint; the thematic material in the bass solo

is introduced in the opening ritornello of the violoncello which also concludes the movement. The opening phrase is repeated seventeen times in the continuo part as a form of quasi-ostinato motif. As  states, this lyrical movement, with its insistence, its repetitions of the text and its vigour, eloquently proclaims the spiritual themes of the second part.

Fifth and sixth movements

The fifth movement is the second aria of the cantata, scored for soprano with an obbligato accompaniment provided by the two recorders playing in unison.

The text, addressed to God, expresses faith, thankfulness and simple humility. The recorder ritornello is written in concertante style, with constantly flowing semiquaver figures, unhurried with no hint of virtuosity. It contrasts with the sustained quavers of the cantabile vocal part, which is imbued with the qualities of a "simple song". The aria follows the same scheme as the first alto aria, with the text divided into two halves, each sung twice, interspersed with instrumental interludes which conclude with a da capo reprise of the ritornello.

The sixth movement is an alto recitative. The lengthy text begins "" (How might then I, O Lord, sufficiently repay thee for all that thou hast done, my flesh and soul to feed?). It is a further supplication to God, giving thanks for His gifts, recognizing the duty to help the needy and praying to be rewarded in the hereafter. Like the first recitative, it is declamatory without arioso sections; but in this case, instead of a bare bass line, it is accompanied by sustained chords in the string section, marked piano, which help create the prayer-like mood.

Seventh movement

The concluding chorale of the cantata is a plain four-part harmonisation of the sixth verse of David Denicke's hymn "" (1648). with the orchestra doubling the vocal parts. It is sung to the melody of "", first published as a hymn tune by Louis Bourgeois. Bach
had previously produced similar harmonisations to different texts in BWV 25, BWV 196 and BWV 32; the chorale from BWV 39, transposed to G major, appears as number 67 in the collection of harmonised chorales prepared by Carl Philipp Emmanuel Bach for Breitkopf and Härtel, reproduced with the same number in the collection of Albert Riemenschneider.

The translation of the text below is from the 1723 Psalmodica Germanica of John Christian Jacobi and Isaac Watts.

Denicke's hymn is a versification of the Sermon on the Mount, in which each beatitude is elaborated in a separate verse. The sixth verse corresponds to the fifth beatitude from Matthew 5:7: "Blessed are the merciful: for they shall obtain mercy."

Recordings 
A list of recordings is provided on the Bach-Cantatas website. Ensembles playing period instruments in historically informed performance are shown by green background.

Notes

References 
Published editions and translations

, uncopyrighted
, German texts with parallel English translations

Books and journal articles

 , with contributions by Christoph Wolff, Peter Wollny, Andreas Glöckner, Martin Petzoldt, Hans-Joachim Schulze, George Stauffer, Daniel Melamed, Stephen Crist, Ulrich Leisinger and Ton Koopman

 

CD liner notes

Other

External links 

 
 Brich dem Hungrigen dein Brot, BWV 39; BC A 96 / Sacred cantata (1st Sunday after Trinity), autograph manuscript,  Bach Digital 
 " 'Music that Drives Away the Devil': the Catechetical Music of Johann Sebastian Bach", Lecture by composer Luke Dahn at Northwestern University, analysing the first section of BWV 39/i

 Luke Dahn: BWV 39.7 bach-chorales.com

Church cantatas by Johann Sebastian Bach
1726 compositions